Samarawickrama Dahanayake Sujani Menaka (born 17 May, 1980 as සුජානි මේනකා) [Sinhala]), popularly as Sujani Menaka, is an actress in Sri Lankan cinema, theater and television. Started as a child artist in advertisements, she is best known for the role in NSB commercial Sathen Sathe and titular role Sara in the teledrama as well as film adaptation.

Personal life
Sujani Menaka was born on 17 May 1980. She is an old girl of St. Paul's Girls School, Milagiriya. Her father was an art director in films.

She is married to popular actor Bimal Jayakody. She met Bimal during the teledrama Ramya Suramya back in 2000. They married in 2007. The couple has two daughters and one son.

Bimal's father is the elder brother of popular actresses Geetha Kanthi Jayakody and Rathna Lalani Jayakody. Geetha's daughter Paboda Sandeepani is also a popular award-winning actress in cinema and television. Rathna Lalani is married to fellow actor Sampath Tennakoon.

Career
She faced a camera at the age of 3 in Prarthana teledrama directed by maestro Lester James Peries. Then, at the age of 10, she was selected for the NSB commercial Sathe Sathe, which gain enormous popularity as a child artist. In 1987, she acted in her maiden cinematic role as a child artist in the film Ahinsa. Her stage drama Athurupasata Chat Ekak will be showing in future.

Selected television serials

 Aluth Gedara as Diana
 Amanda as Meenu
 Api Api Wage
 Chakraangee
 Chandra Vinsathi
 Damini
 Dhawala Yamaya
 Diyaniyo as Hansi
 Gajamuthu
 Giraya
 Hiru Kumari
 Ira Awara
 Isi Dasuna
 Jodu Gedara as Suja
 Loba Nosidewa as Anagi
 Maya Roo
 Mayumi
 Pingala Danawwa
 Pork Veediya 
 Prarthana
 Raahu
 Ramya Suramya
 Sadgunakaraya
 Samanalunta Wedithiyanna 
 Sanda Dev Diyani 
 Sandagalathenna 
 Sanda Mudunata
 Sara as Sara 
 Sasandara 
 Senehasa Kaviyak
 Tharu Kumari
 Udu Sulanga
 Upuli as Upuli
 Vinivindimi Andura
 Vishwanthari 
 Yaso Mandira

Selected stage dramas
 Athurupasata Chat Ekak
 Deseeya Thunseeya

Filmography
Her maiden cinematic experience came through as a child artist in 1987 film Ahinsa, directed by Malani Fonseka. Some of her popular films are Thrishule, Sathya and Sara.

Awards and accolades
She has won several awards at the local stage drama festivals and television festivals.

References

 Official Facebook page

External links
 Sujani Menaka blog
 Nil Balakaya blamed for attack on artistes
 ලබන අවුරුද්දේ තුන්වැනියෙක් බලාපොරොත්තු වෙනවා
 දස වසක් සපිරෙන බිමල් – සුජානි ආදර කතාවේ රහස
 I can see the Danger - Bimal & Sujani Menaka
 සුපුරුදු පරිදි අපි හොඳින් ඉන්නවා
 Love Talk is with popular actress Sujani Menaka
 Need good understanding for better family life
 Pride and patriotism!
 සුජානි මේනකා - Hiru Gossip - Hiru FM

Living people
Sri Lankan film actresses
1980 births